Muqeible or Muqeibla, meaning "The front place", is an Arab town in Israel's Northern District, situated in the Jezreel Valley between Jenin in the West Bank and the Ta'anakh area. The inhabitants are Muslims and Christians.

History

During the Roman-era, a town called "Muqeibleh" stood at the site. Byzantine-era settlement is attested to archaeologically by a well and pottery workshops from that period near the present village.

Ottoman era
According to a local inhabitant, the villagers moved here from the al-Haram-Sidna Ali-area in the latter part of the Ottoman period. 
In 1838 Edward Robinson noted  Mukeibileh  as a “village in the plain, on the direct route from Jenin to Nazareth.”  He placed Mukeibileh  as  being in the District of Jenin, also called "Haritheh esh-Shemaliyeh".

Victor Guérin, who visited in 1870, noted that the village contained 400 inhabitants and had a number of cisterns. In 1882, the PEF's  Survey of Western Palestine described Muqeible as  "a mud village in the plain, supplied by cisterns."

British Mandate era
In the 1922 census of Palestine conducted  by the British Mandate authorities, Muquibleh had a population of 201; 181 Muslims and 20 Christians, where all the Christians were Orthodox. In the 1931 census the population had increased to 270;  244 Muslims and 26 Christians, in a total of 67 houses.

By the 1945 statistics Muqeible had 460 inhabitants, all classified as Muslims. They owned a total of 2,687 dunams of land, while 4,441 dunams were public, a total of 7,128. Of this, 174 dunams were used for plantations or irrigable land, 6,421 for cereals, while 22 dunams were built-up land.

State of Israel
After the 1948 Arab–Israeli War, Muqeible became been part of the Israel.

In 1994, Andrew Petersen, an archaeologist specializing in Islamic architecture, examined the "Hawsh"; a large, square courtyard building, resembling a khan, in the center of the village.  The  central courtyard of the "Hawsh" measures approximately 30m per side. On the east side there is a small gateway, leading into a tall iwan. Petersen noted that the masonry suggested that it was built either in late Ottoman or early Mandate Period.

See also
Arab localities in Israel
 Muqeible Airfield

References

Bibliography

External links
Welcome To Muqeibila
Survey of Western Palestine, Map 8:     IAA, Wikimedia commons
Map, 1946

Arab villages in Israel
Arab Christian communities in Israel
Populated places in Northern District (Israel)